Monte Cremasco is a comune (municipality) in the Province of Cremona in the Italian region Lombardy, located about  southeast of Milan and about  northwest of Cremona.

Monte Cremasco borders the following municipalities: Crespiatica, Dovera, Palazzo Pignano, Pandino, Vaiano Cremasco.

References

Cities and towns in Lombardy